Daniel Marc Snyder (born November 23, 1964) is an American businessman who is the owner of the Washington Commanders, an American football franchise belonging to the National Football League (NFL), from 1999 to 2023. He bought the team, then known as the Washington Redskins, from the estate of former owner Jack Kent Cooke in 1999. 

Snyder's ownership of the team has been heavily criticized, with accusations of a toxic workplace culture and financial improprieties leading to a investigations by the House Committee on Oversight and Accountability and other federal and state agencies, as well as the team's lack of success and general dysfunction.

Early life and education
Snyder was born on November 23, 1964 in Silver Spring, Maryland, the son of Arlette (née Amsellem) and Gerald Seymour "Gerry" Snyder. His family is Jewish. His father was a freelance writer who wrote for United Press International and National Geographic. He attended Hillandale Elementary School in Silver Spring, Maryland. At age 12, he moved to Henley-on-Thames, a small town near London, where he attended private school. At age 14, he returned to the United States and lived with his grandmother in Queens, New York. A year later, his family moved back to Maryland and he graduated from Charles W. Woodward High School in Rockville, Maryland. His first job was at B. Dalton bookstore in the White Flint Mall.

At 17, Snyder experienced his first business failure when he partnered with his father to sell bus-trip packages to Washington Capitals fans to see them play in Philadelphia. By age 20, he had dropped out of the University of Maryland, College Park and was running his own business, leasing jets to fly college students to spring break in Fort Lauderdale and the Caribbean. Snyder claimed to have earned US$1 million running the business out of his parents' bedroom with his friend Joe Craig and several telephone lines.

Snyder courted real estate entrepreneur Mortimer Zuckerman, whose U.S. News & World Report was also interested in the college market and who agreed to finance his push to publish Campus USA, a magazine for college students. Zuckerman and Fred Drasner, co-publisher of Zuckerman's New York Daily News, invested $3 million in Campus USA. The venture did not generate enough paid advertising and was forced to close after two years.

Career

In 1989, Snyder and his sister Michele founded a wallboard advertising (the sale of advertisements placed on boards inside buildings) company with seed money from his father, who took a second mortgage on his property in England, and his sister, who maxed out her credit cards at $35,000. They concentrated on wallboards in doctors' offices (where there was a captive audience) and colleges. They combined the advertisements with the distribution of product samples – such as soaps and packages of medicine – to differentiate themselves from their competitors. The company was named Snyder Communications LP. Snyder and his sister continued to grow the business organically and through acquisitions, expanding its activities to different aspects of outsourced marketing. In 1992, the company expanded into telemarketing with a focus on the immigrant market. Snyder Communications revenues rose from $2.7 million in 1991 to $4.1 million in 1992 and $9 million in 1993.

In an initial public offering for SNC in September 1996, Snyder became the youngest-ever CEO of a New York Stock Exchange listed company at the age of 32. His top investors, including media mogul Barry Diller, New York investor Dan Lufkin, and Robert Strauss, earned significant returns on their initial investment. Mortimer Zuckerman and Fred Drasner, whom Snyder owed $3 million from the failure of his first business venture, were given company stock, which ended up being worth over $500 million. His parents sold their stock in the company for over $60 million.

He continued to expand the company aggressively through a string of acquisitions, including Arnold Communications in 1997. By 1998, the company had over 12,000 employees and $1 billion in annual revenues. In April 2000, Snyder Communications was sold to the French advertising and marketing services group Havas in an all-stock transaction valued at in excess of US$2 billion. Snyder's personal share of the proceeds was estimated to be US$300 million.

Washington Commanders ownership

In May 1999, Snyder purchased the Washington Redskins, along with Jack Kent Cooke Stadium for $800 million following the death of previous owner Jack Kent Cooke. At the time, it was the most expensive transaction in sporting history. The deal was financed largely through borrowed money, including $340 million borrowed from Société Générale and $155 million debt assumed on the stadium. To pay down the team's debt, in 2003, he sold 15 percent of the team to real estate developer Dwight Schar for $200 million, 15 percent to Florida financier Robert Rothman for a like amount; and 5 percent to Frederick W. Smith, the founder of FedEx, leaving him with a 65 percent ownership interest. In 2020, Snyder blocked the minority owners from selling their combined 35 percent ownership stake to an outside party by exercising his right of first refusal, only offering to buy back the 20 percent held by Rothman and Smith but not the 15 percent owned by Schar. In April 2021, after a period of litigation, the league approved Snyder for a debt waiver of $400 million to acquire the remaining ownership stake held by the three in a deal worth over $800 million.

Since Snyder became owner, the team's annual revenue increased from more than $100 million a year when Snyder took over the team in 1999 to around $245 million by 2005.  Snyder has been on six NFL committees, including appointments to the Broadcast Committee, the Business Ventures Committee, the Digital Media Committee, the International Committee, the Stadium Committee and the Hall of Fame Committee. He is also a member of the Board of Trustees of the Pro Football Hall of Fame.

Criticism and controversies
Under Snyder's ownership, the team has a regular season record of 164–220–2 with a post-season record of 2-6. The media allege that his managerial style and workplace culture directly affected the team's performance during his tenure as the principal owner. Under Snyder, the team sued season ticket holders who were unable to pay during the Great Recession in the late 2000s, despite his claim that there were over 200,000 people on the season ticket waiting list. Partway through the 2009 season, Snyder temporarily banned all signs from FedExField, leading to further fan discontentment. Fans have also expressed discontentment about the game day experience, rising ticket and parking prices, and Snyder's policy of charging fans for tailgates in special areas of the stadium lot.

A 2023 survey conducted by the NFL Players Association ranked the Commanders as the worst team to play for, with the lowest grades for their team facilities and lack of commendations for the players and their families.

Redskins name
In May 2013, in response to a question regarding the teams' Federal Trademark, Snyder told the USA Today "We'll never change the name. It's that simple. NEVER—you can use caps." Snyder refused to meet with Native American advocates for a name change. A pitched public relations battle in 2013 and 2014 led Snyder to employ crisis management and PR firms in an effort to defend the name. Snyder's creation of the Washington Redskins Original Americans Foundation in 2014 was seen as a "cheap effort to buy favor from Indian communities" by activists.

Following renewed attention to questions of racial justice in wake of the George Floyd protests in 2020, a letter signed by 87 shareholders and investors was sent to team and league sponsors Nike, FedEx, and PepsiCo urging them to cut their ties unless the name was changed. Around the same time, several retail companies had begun removing Redskins merchandise from their stores. In response, the team underwent a review in July 2020 and announced they would be retiring the name, with a new name and logo to be chosen at a later date. As a team rebranding process usually takes over a year, the team temporarily played as the Washington Football Team for the 2020 and 2021 seasons. The name was changed in early 2022 to the Washington Commanders.

Defamation suit
Threatening a lawsuit in January 2011, Snyder demanded dismissal of Washington City Papers sports writer Dave McKenna, who had penned a lengthy article for the alternative newspaper called "The Cranky Redskins Fan's Guide to Dan Snyder", creating a critical list of controversies involving Snyder. McKenna had been needling Snyder for years in his columns, and the front-page of the article had a defaced picture of Snyder with devil's horns and a beard, an image Snyder claimed was antisemitic.  Other sportswriters have come out in support of McKenna. In a statement released by the Simon Wiesenthal Center, while acknowledging that public figures are fair game for criticism, said the artwork used by the City Paper was reminiscent of "virulent anti-Semitism going back to the Middle Ages" and urged the City Paper issue an apology. Mike Madden of the City Paper issued a statement saying they take accusations of antisemitism very seriously and said the artwork was meant to "resemble the type of scribbling that teenagers everywhere have been using to deface photos" and the cover art was not an antisemitic caricature. In February, Snyder filed a lawsuit against the City Paper before dropping it in September.

Environmental
Lenn Harley, a real estate broker who was not involved in Snyder's purchase of the estate but was familiar with the area, estimated that the relatively unobstructed view of the river and its surroundings that resulted from Snyder's clearing could add $500,000 to $1 million to his $10 million home's value. The clearcutting was started without approval from Montgomery County, Maryland, and without environmental assessments, as required by law. As a result, Snyder was fined $100 by the Maryland-National Capital Park and Planning Commission in December 2004. Snyder's neighbors also filed complaints regarding his clearcutting of scenic and historic easements behind his home.

The NPS ranger who investigated the complaints of Snyder's neighbors and clearcutting along the Potomac was transferred multiple times due to his continued pursuit of the complaints and the Snyder property. Eventually, the NPS ranger filed a whistleblower complaint regarding the Snyder case. Later, the ranger's anonymity as a whistleblower was lost, potentially leading to extreme harassment and a trial of the park ranger, ultimately ending the ranger's career.

Workplace culture
In July 2020, The Washington Post published a series of articles alleging that over 40 women who were former employees of the organization, including office workers and cheerleaders, had been sexually harassed and discriminated against by Snyder and other male executives, colleagues, and players of the team since at least 2006. That December, it was also reported that Snyder had settled a sexual harassment claim with a former female employee for a sum of $1.6 million. The alleged incident had occurred on his private plane while returning from the Academy of Country Music Awards in 2009. Two private investigations at the time, by the team and an outside law firm, failed to substantiate the woman's claim, and it was reported that Snyder paid the sum to avoid any negative publicity.

A year-long independent investigation into the team's workplace culture, led by lawyer Beth Wilkinson, was concluded in July 2021. It found that incidents of sexual harassment, bullying, and intimidation were commonplace throughout the organization under his ownership. The NFL fined the team $10 million in response, with Snyder also voluntarily stepping down from running the team's day-to-day operations for a few months, giving those responsibilities to his wife Tanya. On July 28, 2022, Snyder voluntarily testified before the United States House Committee on Oversight and Reform regarding its own investigation on Washington's history of workplace misconduct.

On December 8, 2022, following a 14 month probe, the House Committee on Oversight and Reform published a report which found that Snyder gave "misleading" answers when he testified about alleged controversies surrounding his team's workplace. The report also accused Snyder of paying former employees "hush money" so they wouldn't come forward with their allegations of abuse which included "sexual misconduct, exploitation of women, bullying of men and other inappropriate behavior," describing it as "commonplace, and that he was a hands-on owner who had a role in nearly every organizational decision." The report also stated the NFL "has not protected workers from sexual harassment and abuse."

Former cheerleader Melanie Coburn testified before Congress that she was sexually harassed up to 200 times during her employment with the team and Brad Baker, a former video production manager for the team, testified that Snyder requested that "lewd footage" of a cheerleader photo shoot that exposed their uncovered private areas, without their knowledge or consent, be compiled into a video which Snyder called "the good bits".

Financial improprieties
In March 2021, reports surfaced that Snyder may have intentionally under reported ticket sales to the NFL and IRS in order to pay a smaller share into the NFL's Visiting Team Fund, allowing him to keep more of the ticket revenue than he otherwise would. On April 12, 2022, the House Oversight Committee sent a letter to the Federal Trade Commission alleging Snyder had been keeping two separate financial ledgers since at least 2012: one that he would submit to the NFL and one that showed the actual numbers, which were much different. Congress also alleged that Snyder would drive up prices by selling cheaper tickets in bulk to third party vendors, causing the remaining tickets to become far more expensive. This would in turn force fans who wanted to attend games at Fedex Field to either join an expensive waiting list or buy expensive tickets. 

A criminal inquiry by the Attorney's Office for the Eastern District of Virginia alleged that Snyder possibly committed bank fraud after learning he was granted a $55 million line of credit in November 2018 without the knowledge and permission of the team's board of directors. In February 2023, a federal grand jury issued subpoenas for a cache of documents related to the team's finances.

Targeting other owners
According to an ESPN report, multiple unnamed sources allege that Snyder has claimed to have "dirt" on other NFL team owners, and has instructed his lawyers to hire investigators to gather damaging information on them as well as NFL commissioner Roger Goodell.

Consumer Protection Lawsuit
Washington DC's attorney general filed a consumer protection lawsuit against the NFL and the Commanders, including Snyder, in October 2022. The criminal inquiry began after the House Oversight committee sent a letter to the Federal Trade Commission, detailing that it had found evidence of deceptive business practices over the span of more than a decade, including withholding ticket revenue from visiting teams and refundable deposits from fans. A US$55 million loan became the primary focus of federal prosecutors, which initially was discovered as a footnote in an April 2020 financial report. The team had taken out the credit line 16 months earlier without the knowledge and required approval of Snyder's minority partners, Robert Rothman, Dwight Schar, and Frederick W. Smith, who owned 40% of the team collectively. Bank of America officials asked team executives repeatedly for proof that the board had approved the loan, but team executives ignored all requests before the loan closed, with one team lawyer later acknowledging that the board approval didn't exist. According to confidential NFL arbitration documents, the partners demanded that the NFL investigate the origin of Snyder's loan, yet neither NFL commissioner Roger Goodell nor the NFL arbitrator investigated the allegations. Four days after the partners asked the NFL arbitrator to seek proof that the loan was legally obtained, the NFL shut down arbitration proceedings.

Other ventures
Snyder owned expansion rights to an Arena Football League team for the Washington, D.C. market before the 2009 demise of the original league. He purchased the rights to the team for $4 million in 1999. The team was going to be called the Washington Warriors and play their games at the Comcast Center in 2003 but the team never started.

In 2005, he bought 12% of the stock of amusement park operator Six Flags through his private equity company RedZone Capital. He later gained control of the board, placing his friend and ESPN executive Mark Shapiro as CEO and himself as chairman. In April 2009, the New York Stock Exchange delisted Six Flags' stock as it had fallen below the minimal market capitalization. In June 2009, Six Flags announced that the company was delaying a $15 million debt payment and two weeks later, Six Flags filed for Chapter 11 bankruptcy protection. As part of the reorganization, 92% of the company ended up in the hands of their lenders with Snyder and Shapiro being removed from their positions.

In July 2006, Red Zebra Broadcasting launched a trio of sports radio stations in Washington, D.C. He purchased other radio stations in the mid-Atlantic region, and broadcast coverage of Washington Redskins games on all of his stations. In 2017 and 2018, Red Zebra sold off all of its radio stations and ceased doing business.

Also in July 2006, Snyder and other investors signed a deal to provide financing to the production company run by Tom Cruise and his partner, Paula Wagner. This came one week after Paramount Pictures severed its ties with Cruise and Wagner. Snyder is credited as an executive producer for the 2008 movie Valkyrie, which starred Cruise.

In February 2007, it was announced that Snyder's private equity firm Red Zone Capital Management would purchase Johnny Rockets, the 1950s-themed diner chain. RedZone Capital Management sold the company to Sun Capital Partners in 2013. From 2007 to 2012, Snyder also owned Dick Clark Productions.

Personal life

In 1994, Snyder married Tanya Ivey, a former fashion model from Atlanta. She is a national spokesperson for breast cancer awareness and was named co-CEO of the team in 2021. They have three children and live in Alexandria, VA. In 2001, Snyder had surgery to remove a cancerous thyroid gland. In November 2022, Snyder incorporated a private limited company in London that listed his residency in England.

Snyder contributed $1 million to help the victims of the September 11 attacks and donated $600,000 to help victims of Hurricane Katrina. He paid shipping costs for charitable food shipments to aid those affected by the 2004 tsunami in Indonesia and Thailand. In 2016 following Hurricane Matthew, Snyder dispatched his private plane to provide emergency supplies in the Bahamas and medical supplies to Hospital Bernard Mevs in Port-au-Prince.

In 2000, Snyder founded the Washington Redskins Charitable Foundation. Snyder has been a long-time supporter of Youth For Tomorrow, an organization founded by former Redskins head coach and Pro Football Hall of Famer Joe Gibbs. In April 2010, the organization presented Snyder with its Distinguished Leader Award. In 2005, Snyder was inducted as a member of the Greater Washington Jewish Sports Hall of Fame. Snyder owns a private plane, a Bombardier BD-700 Global Express XRS.

In 2014, Snyder formed the Washington Redskins Original Americans Foundation to provide opportunities and resources to aid Tribal communities. The foundation was formed to address the challenges in the daily lives of Native Americans. Snyder has also supported Children's National Hospital, the National Center for Missing and Exploited Children (NCMEC), and other organizations. In May 2014, Snyder and Tanya received the Charles B. Wang International Children's Award from the NCMEC. Snyder donated $300,000 to several humanitarian aid organizations for people affected by the Russian invasion of Ukraine in 2022.

References

External links

 Washington Commanders profile
 

1964 births
Living people
American billionaires
American advertising executives
American company founders
Washington Redskins owners
Washington Football Team owners
Washington Commanders owners
University of Maryland, College Park alumni
People from Rockville, Maryland
Jewish American sportspeople
21st-century American Jews
National Football League controversies